PWM rectifier is an AC to DC power converter, that is implemented using forced commutated power  electronic semiconductor switches. Conventional PWM converters are used for wind turbines that have a permanent-magnet alternator.

Today, insulated gate bipolar transistors are typical switching devices. In contrast to diode bridge rectifiers, PWM rectifiers achieve bidirectional power flow. In frequency converters this property makes it possible to perform regenerative braking. PWM rectifiers are also used in distributed power generation applications, such as micro turbines, fuel cells and windmills.

The major advantage of using the pulse width modulation technique is the reduction of higher order harmonics. It also makes it possible to control the magnitude of the output voltage, and improve the power factor by forcing the switches to follow the input voltage waveform using a PLL loop.
Thus we can reduce the total harmonic distortion (THD).

References

Electronic circuits